Ahmad Starks (born September 11, 1992) is an American professional basketball player for the Pelister of the Macedonian First League. Starks played college basketball for both Oregon State University and the University of Illinois.

High school career
As a junior, Starks helped lead Whitney M. Young Magnet High School to a 4A Illinois High School Boys Basketball Championship with a 69-66 victory over Waukegan High School.

After his official visit to Oregon State, Starks verbally committed to the program and former head coach Craig Robinson in August 2008. During his recruitment, Starks considered offers from Northwestern, Valparaiso and Illinois-Chicago and received interest from Marquette, Purdue, Stanford, Virginia and Xavier. During his senior season, Starks averaged 16.1 points, 6.1 assists, 2.8 rebounds and 3.1 steals, leading Whitney Young to another Illinois Class 4A State Championship appearance, only to fall to Simeon Career Academy.

College career
After three seasons at Oregon State, Starks finished as the all-time career leader in three-pointers and single season three-pointers. Starks started in 73 career games at Oregon State and averaged 10.4 points, 2.0 rebounds, 2.3 assists and 1.0 steal as a junior. After his junior season, Starks announced his decision to transfer to aid his ailing grandmother. In May 2013, Starks committed to transfer to play at the University of Illinois. Starks was relegated to take a redshirt year during the 2013–14 season as his hardship waiver request was denied by the NCAA. As a redshirt senior, Starks started in 20 games for Illinois during the 2014–15 season and averaged 7.7 points a game.

Professional career
Starks played with Eco Örebro of the Basketligan in Sweden during the 2015–2016 season and averaged 15.6 points per game. In April 2017, Starks signed with North-West Tasmania Thunder of the South East Australian Basketball League. In December 2017 Starks signed with the KW Titans of the National Basketball League of Canada.

References

External links
Real GM Profile
Illinois Fighting Illini Profile
Oregon State Profile
College Career Statistics

1992 births
Living people
African-American basketball players
American expatriate basketball people in Australia
American expatriate basketball people in Canada
American expatriate basketball people in Sweden
American men's basketball players
Basketball players from Chicago
Guards (basketball)
Illinois Fighting Illini men's basketball players
Oregon State Beavers men's basketball players
Whitney M. Young Magnet High School alumni
21st-century African-American sportspeople